Karl Wölfl (5 January 1914 – 29 November 2004) was an Austrian cyclist. He competed in the team pursuit event at the 1936 Summer Olympics.

References

External links
 

1914 births
2004 deaths
Austrian male cyclists
Olympic cyclists of Austria
Cyclists at the 1936 Summer Olympics
Place of birth missing